Physical metallurgy is one of the two main branches of the scientific approach to metallurgy,  which considers in a systematic way the physical properties of metals and alloys. It is basically the fundamentals and applications of the theory of phase transformations in metal and alloys, as the title of classic, challenging monograph on the subject with this title  . While chemical metallurgy involves the domain of reduction/oxidation of metals, physical metallurgy deals mainly with mechanical and magnetic/electric/thermal properties of metals – treated by the discipline of solid state physics. Calphad methodology, able to produce Phase diagrams which is the basis for evaluating or estimating physical properties of metals, relies on Computational thermodynamics i.e. on Chemical thermodynamics and could be considered a common and useful field for both the two sub-disciplines.

This article has flagged.

See also
Extractive metallurgy
Metallurgical (and Materials) Transactions, a peer-review journal covering Physical Metallurgy and Materials Science

Scientific journals
Metallurgical and Materials Transactions A – open access articles
Metallurgical and Materials Transactions B – open access articles
Acta Materialia – open access articles
Journal of Alloys and Compounds – open access articles

External links
MIT Ocw (MIT OpenCourseWare) Course on Physical Metallurgy
The classic, extensive book single authored book on the subject 
A concise, yet not simplified single authored textbook on Physical Metallurgy
A series of Lectures by Prof. "Harry" Harshad Bhadeshia, University of Cambridge on the Physical Metallurgy of Steels
Additional teaching materials by Prof. "Harry" Harshad Bhadeshia, University of Cambridge, at the Phase Transformations & Complex

Metallurgy
Materials science